The surname Bender derives from both English and German origin.

In England, it derives from old Benden or Benbow. In Germany, it is a form of Fassbinder or Fassbender (Cooper). It is an occupational name in both English and German forms.

Academics 
 Carl M. Bender (born 1943), American applied mathematician and mathematical physicist
 David A. Bender, nutritional biochemist
 Harold H. Bender (1882–1951), professor of philology at Princeton University
 Harold S. Bender (1897–1962), professor of theology
 Lauretta Bender (1897–1987), American child neuropsychiatrist, developer of the Bender-Gestalt Test
 Lionel Bender (1934–2008), American linguist
 Margaret Bender, American anthropologist
 Mark Bender Gerstein, American physical and biological scientist
 Tom Bender (architect), American architect, one of the American founders of the "green architecture" and "sustainability" movements

Arts and entertainment 
 Aimee Bender (born 1969), American novelist
 Chris Bender (film producer) (born 1971), American film producer
 Chris Bender (singer) (1972–1991), American R&B singer
 Darren Bender, known in the UK TV industry for launching several long running new filmmaker initiatives
 Dawn Bender (born 1935), American actress
 Eleanor Bender, American actress
 Howard Bender (born 1951), American comics artist
 Jack Bender (born 1949), American film and television director, television producer and former actor
 Karen Bender, American fiction and nonfiction writer
 Lawrence Bender (born 1957), Hollywood movie producer
 Lon Bender, American Oscar-winning sound editor, businessman and inventor
 Steve Bender (1946–2006), German musician and record producer, formerly of the group Dschinghis Khan
 William Bender (1930–2014), American music critic

Military
 Chester R. Bender (1914–1996), fourteenth Commandant of the United States Coast Guard
 Hans-Wilhelm Bender (1916–1982), German World War II Luftwaffe bomber pilot
 Stanley Bender (1909–1994), United States Army staff sergeant awarded the Medal of Honor

Politics
 Austin Letheridge Bender (1916–1980), mayor of Chattanooga, Tennessee (1969–1971)
 Birgitt Bender (born 1956), German politician
 David Bender, political activist and host of the radio show "Politically Direct" on Air America Radio
 George H. Bender (1896–1961), Republican politician
 John Bender (Ohio politician), member of the Ohio House of Representatives (1993–2000)
 Lisa Bender (born 1978), American politician and city planner
 Riley A. Bender (1890–1973), Republican presidential candidate
 Ryszard Bender (1932–2016), Polish politician and historian
 Silvia Bender (born 1970), German politician

Sports 
 Anthony Bender (born 1995), American baseball player
 Bob Bender (born 1957), American National Basketball Association assistant coach
 Charles Chief Bender (1884–1954), American Hall-of-Fame baseball pitcher
 Denise Bender, American retired soccer player
 Dragan Bender (born 1997), Croatian basketball player in the Israeli Basketball Premier League
 Garrett Bender (born 1991), American rugby union player
 Gary Bender (born 1940), American retired sportscaster
 Jacob Bender (born 1985), National Football League player
 Jakob Bender (1910–1981), German footballer
 John R. Bender (1882–1928), American football player and coach of college football, basketball, and baseball
 Jonathan Bender (born 1981), American retired National Basketball Association player
 Jules Bender (1914–1982), American basketball player
 Lars Bender (born 1989), German footballer, twin brother of Sven Bender
 Lars Bender (footballer, born 1988), German footballer
 Lou Bender (1910–2009), American basketball player
 Manfred Bender (born 1966), German football manager and former player
 Sven Bender (born 1989), German footballer, twin brother of Lars Bender
 Tim Bender (born 1957), American former snowmobile and NASCAR driver
 Todd Bender, American skeet shooter
 Tom Bender (footballer) (born 1993), Welsh footballer
 Walter Bender (Canadian football) (born 1961), American player of gridiron football

Other
 Sir Brian Bender (1949–2021), British civil servant
 Bryan Bender (born 1972), American journalist
 Doris Marie Bender (1911–1991), American social worker
 Frank Bender (1941–2011), American forensic artist
 Hans Bender (1907–1991), German parapsychologist
 Levi Yitzchok Bender (1897–1989), rabbi and leader of the Breslov community in both Uman and Jerusalem
 Michael L. Bender (born 1942), former Chief Justice of the Colorado Supreme Court
 Steven Bender (1950–2010), American serial entrepreneur
 Walter Bender (born 1956), American software engineer and expert in electronic publishing

Fictional characters and nicknames
 Bloody Benders, a family of serial killers
 Ostap Bender, a fictional con man who appeared in the novels The Twelve Chairs and The Little Golden Calf  by Soviet authors Ilya Ilf and Yevgeni Petrov

See also
 Anthony Strollo (1899–1962), New York mobster also known as "Tony Bender"

References

Occupational surnames
English-language occupational surnames